Ehlange-sur-Mess is a small town in the commune of Reckange-sur-Mess, in south-western Luxembourg.  , the town has a population of 405.

It is situated on the Mess River, from which its suffix is derived.

Reckange-sur-Mess
Towns in Luxembourg